This is a list of Billboard magazine's Top Hot 100 songs of 1982. The Top 100, as revealed in the year-end edition of Billboard dated December 25, 1982, is based on Hot 100 charts from the issue dates of November 1, 1981 through October 31, 1982.

See also
1982 in music
List of Billboard Hot 100 number-one singles of 1982
List of Billboard Hot 100 top-ten singles in 1982

References

1982 record charts
Billboard charts